Major-General Michael Henry Saward (22 December 1840 – 1928) was a British Army officer who became Lieutenant Governor of Guernsey.

Military career
Saward became a lieutenant in the Royal Artillery in Bengal in 1862. He remained in Bengal throughout his career and was ultimately appointed Assistant Adjutant General of the Royal Artillery in Bengal, a post he only relinquished in 1894. He was appointed Lieutenant Governor of Guernsey in 1899.

He is buried at St John the Evangelist Church at Dormansland in Surrey. He was also a Colonel Commandant of the Royal Artillery.

Family
In 1877 he married Kath Maisey.

References

1840 births
1928 deaths
British Army generals
Royal Artillery officers